Year 1350 (MCCCL) was a common year starting on Friday (link will display the full calendar) of the Julian calendar.

Events 
 January–December 
 January 9 – Giovanni II Valente becomes Doge of Genoa.
 May 23 (possible date) – Hook and Cod wars in the County of Holland: A number of nobles and progressive cities supporting William V, Count of Holland, in his power struggle with his mother Margaret I, Countess of Holland, found the Cod League and perhaps sign the Cod Alliance Treaty.
 August 29 – Battle of Winchelsea (Les Espagnols sur Mer) off the south coast of England: An English fleet personally commanded by King Edward III defeats a Castilian fleet. 
 September 5 – Hook and Cod wars in the County of Holland: Conservative noblemen found the Hook League and sign the Hook Alliance Treaty.
 November 17 – To pay for the expenses of the revived war with the Republic of Venice, the Republic of Genoa has to subscribe a loan at an interest rate of 10%, from an association of creditors known as the Compera imposita per gerra Venetorum.

 Date unknown 
 Hayam Wuruk becomes ruler of the Majapahit Empire.
 The Punta Lobos massacre is carried out by members of the powerful Chimu Empire in Peru, leaving a residue of 200 murders.
 The Black Death first appears in Scotland and  Sweden.
 The castle of Rapperswil is largely destroyed by Rudolf Brun, mayor of the city of Zürich.

Births 
 January 23 – Vincent Ferrer, Valencian missionary and saint (d. 1419)
 April 13 – Margaret III, Countess of Flanders (d. 1405)
 June 27 – Manuel II Palaiologos, Byzantine Emperor (d. 1425)
 October 12 – Dmitri Donskoi, Grand Duke of Muscovy and Vladimir (d. 1389)
 November 25 – Katherine Swynford, mistress of John of Gaunt (approximate date; d. 1403)
 December 27 – John I of Aragon (d. 1396)
 date unknown
 Jehuda Cresques, Catalan cartographer (d. 1427)
 Agnolo Gaddi, Italian painter (d. 1396)
 William Gascoigne, Chief Justice of England (approximate date; d. 1419)
 Thomas Holland, 2nd Earl of Kent (d. 1397)
 John Montacute, 3rd Earl of Salisbury (approximate date; d. 1400)
 Madhava of Sangamagrama, Indian mathematician (d. 1425)
 John I Stanley of the Isle of Man (approximate date; d. 1414)
 Hrvoje Vukčić Hrvatinić (d. 1415)
 William le Scrope, 1st Earl of Wiltshire (d. 1399)
 Andrew of Wyntoun, Scottish historian (d. 1420)
 Záviš von Zap, Czech theologian and composer (d. c. 1411)

Deaths 
 January 6 – Giovanni I di Murta, second doge of the Republic of Genoa
 March 26 or 27 March – Alfonso XI of Castile (b. 1311)
 August 22 – Philip VI of France (b. 1293)
 November 19 – Raoul II of Brienne, Count of Eu
 December 26 – Jean de Marigny, French bishop
 date unknown
 Maol Íosa V, Earl of Strathearn, last Gaelic Mormaer of Strathearn
 Gayatri Rajapatni, Queen consort of Majapahit
 probable 
 Juan Ruiz, Archpriest of Hita (b. c. 1283)
 Margaret, Countess of Soissons
 Namdev, Marathi saint and poet (b. 1270)
 supposed – Till Eulenspiegel, German prankster

References